Women and Men 2 is the second installment of HBO's made-for-television short films based on works by American authors. Directed by Walter Bernstein, Mike Figgis, and Kristi Zea, the film stars Matt Dillon, Kyra Sedgwick, Ray Liotta, Andie MacDowell, Scott Glenn and Juliette Binoche.

Cast
Matt Dillon as Eddie Megeffin
Kyra Sedgwick as Arlene Megeffin
Ray Liotta as Martin Meadows
Andie MacDowell as Emily Meadows
Scott Glenn as Henry
Juliette Binoche as Mara

External links 
 

1991 television films
1991 films
1991 drama films
1990s English-language films
Films based on works by Carson McCullers
Films directed by Mike Figgis
Films scored by Anton Sanko
American television films